Dominic James Malone (born 12 December 1974) is a former professional rugby union player from England who represented Bedford Blues, Northampton Saints and Irish provincial side Munster during his career.

Career
Having previously represented hometown club Bedford Blues, Malone spent five seasons playing for Northampton Saints, with whom he won the 1999–2000 Heineken Cup. Saints defeated Irish province Munster 9–8 in the final, who Malone went on to join in 2002. Whilst at Munster, Malone was registered with Limerick club UL Bohemians.

References

External links
Munster Profile

1974 births
Living people
English rugby union players
Northampton Saints players
Munster Rugby players
UL Bohemians R.F.C. players
Rugby union scrum-halves
Rugby union players from Bedford